The Marine Corps Special Operations Command Detachment One, also simply known as Det One, was a pilot program of attaching a permanent unit of the United States Marine Corps to the United States Special Operations Command. It was commanded by Col. Robert J. Coates, former commanding officer of 1st Force Reconnaissance Company. Det One was activated on 19 June 2003 and had its headquarters at Camp Del Mar Boat Basin in Camp Pendleton, California. It was disbanded in 2006 and succeeded by the permanent United States Marine Corps Forces Special Operations Command (MARSOC).

Personnel
The unit consisted of 81 Marines and 5 Navy Corpsmen divided among 4 sections:
reconnaissance element (30 men)
Marine Corps Intelligence element (29 men), containing a headquarters element and
a Radio Reconnaissance Team (RRT), (9 men)
a SIGINT support team (3 men)
a human intelligence (HUMINT) exploitation team (HET), (6 men)
an all-source fusion team (12 men)
fires element (7 men)
headquarters element

The original Marines that formed the detachment were hand-picked from over 500 superior candidates. Despite common misconceptions, Det One was not a beefed-up Force Reconnaissance platoon. While the reconnaissance element was composed mostly of Force Recon Marines, they made up only 24 of the 86 members of the detachment. The detachment, though lacking organic aviation, operated under the Marine Air-Ground Task Force philosophy of leveraging integrated, complementary capabilities to be more effective than the sum of its parts.

More than half of Det One's Recon Marines were trained Scout Snipers.

Insignia
Detachment One's Insignia comes from the World War II Marine Raider's patch, a blue patch with a skull and stars. The insignia was created by LtCol (then-GySgt) Anthony Siciliano, USMC. The scarlet, blue, and gold disk represents the unit's joint Navy-Marine Corps origins. The crossed stiletto/lightning bolt represents the unit's special operations mission, and its global communications reach. The parachute wings represent airborne-qualified status and the mask above it represents the combatant diver qualification.

History
Although Detachment One was a relatively new unit its heritage can be traced back to World War II Marine Raiders. In World War II, the Marine Raiders were formed to seize key beaches and hills and also conduct guerrilla-style strikes against Imperial Japanese Forces. After two years the Raiders were disbanded but they set the stage for other raider-style units like Detachment One. 

In 1986, when the Department of Defense established the new joint Special Operations Command, the Marine Corps opted not to participate. Then Commandant Paul X. Kelley expressed the belief popular in the Corps that Marines should support Marines, and that the Corps should not fund a special warfare capability that would operate independently of the Fleet Marine Force. The Corps wanted to retain the Corps' Force Reconnaissance units within the MAGTF command structure and prevent the development of an "elite" within the Marine Corps. Marine Corps leadership believed that such a development would be at the expense of the effectiveness of the Corps as a whole. However, following the 11 September attacks and the current global war on terror, that view began to shift. Defense Secretary Rumsfeld immediately directed the Marine Corps and USSOCOM to work more closely together in what would be called the global war on terror. Marine resistance to special warfare units dissipated when Marine leaders watched the Corps' "crown jewels" – the 15th and 26th MEU Maritime Special Purpose Forces – sit on the sidelines during the early stages of Operation Enduring Freedom while other special warfare units led the way. Resistance from SOF commanders already in-country and indifference from the Navy chain of command left the MEU(SOC)s unused for over a month, relegated to supporting roles where SOF lacked manpower.

In October 2002, Commandant James L. Jones, after consultation with USSOCOM leaders, directed the establishment of a Marine unit for permanent USSOCOM employment. Out of this came the T/O for Detachment One, officially activated aboard Camp Pendleton on 19 June 2003.

After completion of Navy special warfare (NSW) certification and other training, Det One was deployed to Iraq in March 2004 for Operation Iraqi Freedom. Operating under Naval Special Warfare Group One, Det One executed direct action, coalition support, and battlefield-shaping operations. A study conducted by the Joint Special Operations University (JSOU) found that
The trial deployment demonstrated the MCSOCOM Det could effectively conduct direct action (DA) and special reconnaissance (SR). It is reasonable to suggest that the Detachment could also conduct or support foreign internal defense (FID), counter-terrorism (CT), special activities, selected theater security cooperation plans (TSCP), and other tasks as required.

Det One was dubbed as "Task Unit Raider" and deployed alongside US Navy SEAL task units contained within Naval Special Warfare Task Group - Arabian Peninsula, which was part of CJSOTF-AP (Combined Joint Special Operations Task Force-Arabian Peninsula). As the deployment took shape, the operators of the Task Unit Raider and Task Unit Thunder (built around GROM) would become the task force's primary direct action assets, operating in conjunction on multiple occasions.

Det One's first "real" mission - a close target reconnaissance operation - was aided by a GROM sniper, in which the target (a suspected insurgent sniper) was apprehended by the GROM sniper. Task Unit Raider first operated in and around Baghdad before being ordered by CJSOTF-AP to send its snipers to al-Najaf (a stronghold for the Mahdi Army) to relieve pressure on the 11th MEU. Det One proceeded to demoralize the militiaman by "wiping out" dozens of enemy combatants, confusing them as to the point of origin of the unrelenting lethal fire. In addition, Det One kept their marksman on their SR-25s around the clock-providing no respite for the militia. Det One's Scout snipers also carried out two successful countersniper operations, obliterating Shia insurgent positions and the snipers themselves with .50-caliber Barret M82 fire.

In preparation for the Second Battle of Fallujah, Marines from the Det One, along with Green Berets from the 5th SFG, SEALs, and Marine Force Recon, were heavily involved in shaping operations prior to the 7 November D-DAY when coalition forces entered the city.

However, the deployment also revealed interservice tensions. The Navy commander of Naval Special Warfare Squadron One did not utilize Det One as a cohesive unit but parceled its capabilities as needed. In particular, the intelligence section was parceled out to other Navy units, instead of supporting Det One operations, as the Navy lacked intelligence personnel who understood ground combat.

Following the conclusion of the deployment in September 2004, the Marine Corps and USSOCOM continued to negotiate details of the long-term relationship through 2005, while Det One trained for a possible second deployment. Though deployment proposals were rejected on the basis that Det One was to provide the nucleus of the future permanent MARSOC organization, it was disbanded on 10 March 2006 and its members dispersed throughout the Marine Corps. The experience of Det One provided critical intelligence on the organization and integration of a Marine special-operations force into USSOCOM and was instrumental to the planning of MARSOC.

See also
1st Force Reconnaissance Company
Force Reconnaissance
Radio Reconnaissance Platoon
Marine Forces Special Operations Command
Strider SMF
Critical skills operator

References

External links

Detachment One
Inactive units of the United States Marine Corps